Juvenile Justice Boards are Indian quasi-judicial bodies that decide whether juveniles accused of a crime should be tried as an adult.

History 

Juvenile Justice Boards were formed by State Governments under the Juvenile Justice (Care and Protection of Children) Act, 2015.

Members on board and eligibility 

Each Juvenile Justice Board consists of one first-class judicial magistrate and two social workers at least one of whom is a woman. They are paid an honorarium. Terms last two years for those of ages 35–65. To qualify as a board member, the applicant should have been engaged for seven years in the areas of health, education or other child welfare activities or should be a qualified professional with a degree from an accredited Institute and practicing in Law, Sociology, Psychology, or Psychiatry relating to children.

Functions 

Juvenile Justice Boards have the following functions:

 To be informed of the details on the presence of children and their parents/guardians during the proceddings before the board.
 Ensure protection of children's rights during the course of legal proceedings.
 Provide a translator or interpreter if he/she is unable to understand the language used in legal proceedings.
 Ensure that proceedings are followed in accordance with section 14 of the Juvenile Justice Act.
 Any other functions assigned to the board as per the Juvenile Justice Act.

Pre-requisites for consideration as a minor 

The Juvenile Justice Board considers the following circumstances before declaring any juvenile as minor:

 Physical ability of the juvenile to commit alleged crime.
 Mental ability of the juvenile.
 Potential of the juvenile to analyse and understand crime consequences.
 Circumstances leading to the commitment of alleged offence.

Juveniles classified as adults may face serious punishments such as life imprisonment that are applicable for adult criminals.

See also 

 Juvenile Court.

References 

Juvenile courts
Quasi-judicial bodies of India